The 1978 North Carolina Tar Heels football team represented the University of North Carolina at Chapel Hill during the 1978 NCAA Division I-A football season. The Tar Heels were led by first-year head coach Dick Crum and played their home games at Kenan Memorial Stadium in Chapel Hill, North Carolina. They competed as members of the Atlantic Coast Conference, finishing in fourth.

Schedule

Roster
RB Amos Lawrence, So.

References

North Carolina
North Carolina Tar Heels football seasons
North Carolina Tar Heels football